Luwuk is the capital of Banggai Regency, Central Sulawesi, Indonesia. Its area is 72.82 km2 following boundary changes in 2012 and 2015. There used to be an oil industry in the region. At the 2020 census it had a total population of 34,849 in the town.

The universities in Luwuk are UNTIKA and UNISMUH. Syukuran Aminuddin Amir Airport serves the area.

Luwuk has 3 indigenous ethnic groups - Saluan, Balantak, and  Banggai.

Climate
Luwuk has a tropical savanna climate (Aw) with little to moderate rainfall year-round. It is one of the driest places in Indonesia.

References

Banggai Regency
Districts of Central Sulawesi
Regency seats of Central Sulawesi